Zond 7, a formal member of the Soviet Zond program and unpiloted version of Soyuz 7K-L1 crewed Moon-flyby spacecraft, the first truly successful test of L1, was launched towards the Moon on a Proton-K D rocket on August 7, 1969, on a mission of further studies of the Moon and circumlunar space, to obtain color photography of Earth and the Moon from varying distances, and to flight test the spacecraft systems. Earth photos were obtained on August 9, 1969. On August 11, 1969, the spacecraft flew past the Moon at a distance of 1984.6 km and conducted two picture taking sessions. On its way back from the moon the spacecraft tested its radio systems by transmitting recorded voices. Zond 7 reentered Earth's atmosphere on August 14, 1969, and achieved a soft landing in a preset region south of Kustanai, Kazakhstan. On its trip the craft carried 4 turtles. A human-like tissue-equivalent phantom for radiation measurements has been placed aboard. The phantom was equipped with 20 channels for radiation detectors (thermoluminescent glasses and nuclear photoemulsions) distributed along the whole body for measurement of doses in critical organs. The doses accumulated during the flight through the radiation belts and around the Moon were between 0.2 and 0.7 rad in different points at the depth of 3 g/cm2 from the body surface.

Like other Zond circumlunar craft, Zond 7 used a relatively uncommon technique called skip reentry to shed velocity upon returning to Earth.
Of all circumlunar Soviet Zond craft launches, Zond 7 would have been the first to make a safe flight for a cosmonaut had it been crewed.

The return capsule is on display at the Dmitrov Facility of Bauman University in Orevo, Russia.

Notes 

 This article was originally based on material from NASA (NSSDC) information on Zond 7

References

External links
 Soviet Lunar Images
 NASA page on Zond 7 NSSDC ID: 1969-067A

Missions to the Moon
Zond program
Spacecraft launched in 1969
1969 in the Soviet Union
Lunar flybys